Beaver Motorsports (formerly MAKE Motorsports) is an American drag racing team. The team currently fields a Chevrolet Pro Stock entry in the NHRA. Beaver Motorsports formerly competed in the NASCAR Xfinity Series and NASCAR Gander Outdoors Truck Series.

Nationwide Series

Car No. 50 history

The team started off in the Nationwide Series with T. J. Bell, who had run races for the team in the Camping World Truck Series. He ran six races in the team's first season in Xfinity, 2011, start and parking for four of them, and failing to qualify for three others. He recorded a best finish of 23rd at Charlotte Motor Speedway.

In 2012, the team went the distance in races during the first part of the season, but with three wrecks and two mechanical problems in the first nine races of the season, the team resorted to start and parking after the Kentucky Speedway race. After the race at Iowa Speedway, Bell left the team and was replaced by David Starr, who did not finish a race in his three races for the team and failed to qualify for another. After running the Dover International Speedway race with The Motorsports Group, Bell returned to the team, failing to qualify for the Charlotte race and completing only one lap at Texas Motor Speedway before retiring in last place with engine problems. He recorded a best finish of 24th, which occurred in the season-opening DRIVE4COPD 300 at Daytona International Speedway and the 5-Hour Energy 200 at Dover in spring.

Danny Efland then took over for 2013 after starting and parking for MAKE in the Camping World Truck Series. He followed suit in the Nationwide Series, doing so for all three of his races and failing to qualify for five others. He posted a best finish of 34th at Iowa Speedway.

Car No. 50 results

Camping World Truck Series

Truck No. 1 history
Milka Duno debuted this truck in 2014, leading two laps and finishing 25th in the Fred's 250 at Talladega Superspeedway.

The team made the truck full-time for 2015, with multiple drivers in the seat. Donnie Neuenberger ran the season-opening NextEra Energy Resources 250, finishing 31st after being involved in a Lap 14 crash. Morgan Shepherd ran the next race, qualifying 30th and finishing 27th at Atlanta Motor Speedway. Travis Kvapil ran the next race, falling out with rear gear problems after 83 laps of the Kroger 250. Ryan Ellis took over command of the truck, finishing 20th at Kansas Speedway. Kyle Fowler then made his only Camping World Truck Series start of 2015, logging a 20th-place finish in the North Carolina Education Lottery 200 at Charlotte Motor Speedway. Ellis then drove the next four races in the truck, posting a best finish of 17th at Gateway Motorsports Park. Kvapil then returned from the No. 50 truck, driving the next four races and having a best finish of 14th at Kentucky Speedway. Ellis then returned to run the UNOH 200, finishing 28th. Kvapil ran the next five races for the team, with a 17th at New Hampshire Motor Speedway as his best effort in that timespan. The team then sold out its spot to Rick Ware Racing for the next race at Martinsville Speedway. Kvapil ran the next race, finishing 22nd at Texas Motor Speedway. The team then sold its spot to Ware for the penultimate race. Stacey ran the final race of the season, finishing 24th.

Before the 2017 season, former co-owner Tracy Lowe took ownership of the No. 1 and formed her own team, TJL Motorsports, with it.

In 2019, the team returned with Travis Kvapil, Stefan Parsons and Cody McMahan, all of them drove one race each.

Truck No. 14 history
In 2016, the No. 14 Chevy was run by Natalie Decker at Martinsville (Spring) and failed to qualify into the race.

Truck No. 50 history
The team debuted in the Camping World Truck Series at the 2010 Nashville 200 with G. R. Smith at the wheel.  In his only start with the team, Smith qualified 32nd and finished last in the 36 truck field, retiring with engine troubles. T. J. Bell then joined the team to race part-time, with sponsorship from Liberty Tire Recycling, which was also the team's tire recycler. In his first race, he finished 27th at Charlotte Motor Speedway, retiring 14 laps from the end with engine problems. In his next race, at Darlington Raceway, Bell crashed out after 73 laps. In the final race of the season for the team, Bell finally finished a race, 19th at Texas Motor Speedway.

In 2011, the team ran Bell in three more races, crashing at Daytona International Speedway and Charlotte Motor Speedway, finishing in only the Darlington race. He finished 22nd, a lap down.

The team would only attempt two Truck races in 2012, both with Natalie Sather, but she failed to qualify both times. Instead, they focused on their efforts with Bell in the Xfinity Series.

In 2013, the team started with Danny Efland at Charlotte, the only race he finished that season. After a 20th there, he start and parked for three races.

Travis Kvapil drove the first two races for the team in 2014, posting finishes of 22nd at Daytona and 23rd at Martinsville Speedway. T. J. Bell then returned to the team, running the distance at the start but then starting and parking near the end of the season. He tallied a best finish of 15th at Dover International Speedway in his 17 starts with the team. Jordan Anderson then ran the penultimate race at Phoenix International Raceway, finishing 24th. Wendell Chavous then ran the finale at Homestead-Miami Speedway, finishing 31st after falling out with electrical problems.

Heading into the 2015 season, Cody Ware was set to run the entire season with the team. However, after he failed to qualify for the season-opening NextEra Energy Resources 250, crashing in the next race and retiring with a vibration in the third race, Ware stopped racing the truck. Travis Kvapil then transitioned over from the No. 1 truck, running the next three events, retiring with rear gear problems at Kansas Speedway, crashing out at  Charlotte Motor Speedway, and finishing 19th at Dover International Speedway. Donnie Neuenberger then made his next start for the team since driving the No. 1 at Daytona earlier that year. However, engine problems hampered his efforts in the WinStar World Casino 400, forcing him to retire after eight laps. Kvapil then returned to the truck, posting finishing 14th at Gateway Motorsports Park and 24th at Iowa Speedway. Ryan Ellis then came over from the No. 1 truck for the race at Kentucky Speedway, finishing 30th after dealing with electrical problems. The team then sold out its owner points to Jody Knowles for the Eldora Speedway race. The team sold out its spot for the next race, to Kyle Martel. Tyler Tanner then ran the next race for the team, starting and parking at Michigan International Speedway. Kvapil then returned for the next race at Bristol Motor Speedway, finishing 19th. Ellis then ran the next two races, starting and parking. Tanner continued doing the same for the next two races. Ellis then failed to qualify the truck at Talladega Superspeedway. Kvapil then piloted the truck in the next race, finishing 15th at Martinsville Speedway. Dexter Stacey then ran the No. 50 for the next race, finishing 29th at Texas Motor Speedway after starting and parking. Kvapil then returned to the truck for the final two races, finishing 15th at Phoenix International Raceway and 22nd at Homestead-Miami Speedway.

Kvapil continued his relationship with the team in 2016, driving the No. 50 close to full-time, just switching to the No. 1 entry in the season finale so that Spencer Boyd could take the No. 50.

In 2017, the team was renamed to Beaver Motorsports and continued to field the No. 50 full-time. In the six first races of the season the team made a partnership with Rick Ware Racing with Cody Ware and Spencer Boyd, both RWR drivers at that time sharing the ride. Starting in the seventh race the partnership ended and Josh Reaume drove almost every race, with an exception of Pocono that the team withdrew, Eldora and Mosport Park, where Beaver made a partnership with Mike Harmon Racing, Harmon himself drove at Eldora and Bobby Reuse, MWR driver at that time drove at Mosport Park and Martinsville (fall) where Bayley Currey made his NASCAR debut.

Truck No. 55 history
Jake Crum ran this number for one race in 2011, crashing out at Texas Motor Speedway.

Drag racing
In 2020, the team began a NHRA Pro Stock effort, fielding entries for multiple drivers throughout the course of the season.

References

External links
 

NASCAR teams
National Hot Rod Association teams
Auto racing teams established in 2010